KRLW (1320 AM) is a radio station broadcasting an oldies format. Licensed to Walnut Ridge, Arkansas, United States, the station serves the Jonesboro area. The station is currently owned by Combined Media Group, Inc. and features programming from ABC Radio.

References

External links

Oldies radio stations in the United States
RLW